Robert Eugene Abraham (born July 13, 1960) is a former American football linebacker in the National Football League for the Houston Oilers.

References

1960 births
Living people
People from Myrtle Beach, South Carolina
Players of American football from South Carolina
American football linebackers
Houston Oilers players
NC State Wolfpack football players